Bayani may refer to:
 Azali
 Bayani, Afghanistan
 Bayani, Iran
 Bayani (album)
 Bayani (political party)
 Bayani (TV series), Filipino educational TV program
 Bayani Agbayani, Filipino comedian
 Bayani Casimiro, Filipino dancer and comedian
 Bayani Fernando, Filipino politician
 Bayani: Kanino Ka Kakampi?, Philippine video game
 The Groovy Girls doll line, by Manhattan Toy, features a female doll named Bayani

See also
 Bayan (disambiguation)